Girard is a town in Burke County, Georgia, United States. The population was 156 at the 2010 census. It is part of the Augusta, Georgia metropolitan area.

History 
Girard was incorporated in 1902.

Geography
Girard is located at  (33.040994, -81.711108).

Girard is located near the South Carolina state line on State Highway 23.

Demographics

At the 2010 census, there were 156 people living in the town. The racial makeup of the town was 67.9% White, 31.4% Black and 0.6% were Hispanic or Latino of any race.

At the 2000 census there were 227 people, 84 households and 54 families living in the town. The racial make-up  was 56.83% White, 41.41% African American and 1.76% from two or more races. Hispanic or Latino of any race were 1.76%.

Of the 84 households 39.3% had children under the age of 18 living with them, 40.5% were married couples living together, 22.6% had a female householder with no husband present, and 35.7% were non-families. 33.3% of households were one person and 13.1% were one person aged 65 or older.  The average household size was 2.70 and the average family size was 3.57.

The age distribution was 33.0% under the age of 18, 11.5% from 18 to 24, 24.7% from 25 to 44, 19.4% from 45 to 64, and 11.5% 65 or older.  The median age was 29 years. For every 100 females, there were 99.1 males.  For every 100 females age 18 and over, there were 97.4 males.

The median household income was $22,857 and the median family income was $29,583. Males had a median income of $33,750 and females $17,292. The per capita income was $9,600. About 24.6% of families and 34.4% of the population were below the poverty line, including 38.6% of those under the age of eighteen and 36.8% of those sixty five or over.

See also 

Central Savannah River Area

References

External links
 Girard at Georgia.gov

Towns in Burke County, Georgia
Towns in Georgia (U.S. state)
Augusta metropolitan area